After the 1891 Chilean Civil War and the dissolution of the coalition between conservatives, radicals and antibalmacedist liberals the Radical Party, the Democrat Party and several liberal organizations formed the Liberal Alliance. It was the  main opposer of the Coalition. Along with the Coalition, it was one of the two parties of the bipartisan system of that period, the era of the Chilean parliamentary republic. The Alliance would later be called the Liberal Union, during a period in which it was a union of the radicals, the democrats and all liberal groups (liberals, liberal democrats, nationals and the doctrinary liberals) . It disappeared in 1925.

Presidential candidacies supported by the Liberal Alliance
1891 - Jorge Montt Álvarez (elected as president thanks to an agreement between all the political parties of his candidacy)
1896 – Vicente Reyes Palazuelos (not elected)
1901 – Germán Riesco Errázuriz (elected as president)
1906 – Pedro Montt Montt (elected as president)
1910 – Ramón Barros Luco (elected as president thanks to an agreement between all the political parties of his candidacy)
1915 – Javier Ángel Figueroa Larraín (not elected)
1920 – Arturo Alessandri Palma (elected as president)

Electoral Results (1891-1924)

Members of the parliament

Senadors

Sources
The original version of this article draws heavily on the corresponding article in the Spanish-language Wikipedia, which was accessed in the version of 8 June 2007.

See also
Liberal Party (Chile, 1849–1966)
Liberalism and radicalism in Chile

Political parties established in 1891
Defunct political party alliances in Chile
1891 establishments in Chile
1925 disestablishments in Chile